Theresa Ann Healy (1932-2016) was the first female American ambassador to Sierra Leone, serving from 1980 until 1983. Healy was a career Foreign Service Officer from 1955 until her retirement in 1995, serving in Naples, Milan, and Bern before her ambassadorship.

Healy was born on July 14, 1932, in New York City to Anthony and Mary Healy. She attended Catholic schools, eventually graduating from St. John's University in 1954. She joined the Foreign Service the following year. In addition to her overseas assignments, she also served multiple tours of duty at the State Department, including as an intelligence research specialist and economist.

References

20th-century American diplomats
20th-century American women
Ambassadors of the United States to Sierra Leone
American women ambassadors
United States Foreign Service personnel
1932 births
St. John's University (New York City) alumni